The 1962 South Australian state election was held on 3 March 1962.

Retiring Members

Labor

 Jim Corcoran, MHA (Millicent)

Liberal and Country

 Leslie Nicholson, MHA (Light)
 Walter Duncan, MLC (Midland District)
 Harry Edmonds, MLC (Northern District)

House of Assembly
Sitting members are shown in bold text. Successful candidates are highlighted in the relevant colour. Where there is possible confusion, an asterisk (*) is also used.

Legislative Council
Sitting members are shown in bold text. Successful candidates are highlighted in the relevant colour and identified by an asterisk (*).

References

Candidates for South Australian state elections
1960 elections in Australia
1960s in South Australia